Cuckoo in the Nest is a 1978 Australian television sitcom starring Jeannie Little.

References

External links
Cuckoo in the Nest at IMDb

Seven Network original programming
Australian drama television series
1978 Australian television series debuts
1979 Australian television series endings